Laguneros de la Comarca (English: Comarca Lakers) is a professional Mexican basketball team, based in Torreón, Coahuila. The Laguneros are part of the Liga Nacional de Baloncesto Profesional, the top professional basketball league in Mexico. The team plays their home games at the Auditorio Municipal de Torreón, with a capacity of 4,363 spectators.

History
Laguneros was founded in 2018 and joined the Liga Nacional de Baloncesto Profesional for the 2018–19 season, joining to Huracanes de Tampico and Leñadores de Durango as expansion teams.

The team chose purple, black and white as their colors and the nickname Laguneros, which is the demonym for people from the Comarca Lagunera, a region in the states of Coahuila and Durango, that would roughly translate into "people from the lagoons".

Previously, the Laguna region had professional basketball representation in the LNBP with two teams: Algodoneros de la Comarca and Jefes de Fuerza Lagunera, both teams played in the city of Torreón.

Players

Current roster

References

External links 
 Team profile 

Basketball teams in Mexico
Basketball teams established in 2018
2018 establishments in Mexico
Sports teams in Coahuila
Torreón